Zangian (also Romanized as Zangīān and Zangiyan; also known as Zangeneh Maḩalleh and Zangī Maḩallēh) is a village in Anjirabad Rural District, in the Central District of Gorgan County, Golestan Province, Iran. At the 2006 census, its population was 3,810, in 950 families.

References 

Populated places in Gorgan County